Phycis phycis, the forkbeard, is a species of phycid hakes in the family Phycidae.

Etymology
Genus and species names Phycis derive from Greek, phykon meaning seaweed, as these fishes usually live hidden among seaweeds.

Description

These fishes have a wide mouth with thick lips. A barbel is present on the chin. They do not have any thorn in the fins, but show elongated pelvic-fin rays reduced to bifid filaments, with 2 soft rays. The dorsal fin is a double and rounded (the first can have 9 or 11 soft rays, the second 56 or 65). The caudal fin is rounded, with 27 or 29 soft rays. Vertical fins distally reaching the origin of the anal fin. They are dark, sometimes with a pale margin. Body color is dark brown or gray on the back, but ventrally the color becomes paler.

Biology
Forkbeards are nocturnal, during the day they hide between rocks. They feed on small fish and several species of invertebrates. Breeding takes place from January to May. They are relatively slow growing and long lived fishes.

Distribution and habitat
This species is present in the Mediterranean, in Portugal and in western coast of northern Africa and the Azores. These fishes live on hard and sandy-muddy bottoms close to the rocks usually, at depths of 100–650 m.

References

Patrick Louisy, Guida all'identificazione dei pesci marini d'Europa e del Mediterraneo, a cura di Trainito, Egidio, Milano, Il Castello, 2006, .
Sergio Pili, Pesci:guida pratica per il consumatore, Nuoro, 1997

External links
 

Phycidae
Fish described in 1766
Taxa named by Carl Linnaeus